Radu Ioan Chiriac (born 4 January 2000) is a Romanian professional footballer who plays as a midfielder for Astra Giurgiu.

Honours
Astra Giurgiu
Cupa României: Runner-up 2018–19

References

External links
 
 
 Radu Chiriac at lpf.ro

2000 births
Living people
Sportspeople from Iași
Romanian footballers
Association football midfielders
FC Argeș Pitești players
Liga I players
FC Astra Giurgiu players
Liga II players
FC Metaloglobus București players